Caicedo-Sopeña is a hamlet and council located in the municipality of Ribera Alta/Erriberagoitia, in Álava province, Basque Country, Spain. As of 2020, it has a population of 32.

Geography 
Caicedo-Sopeña is located 26km west-southwest of Vitoria-Gasteiz.

References

Populated places in Álava